Wygiełzów may refer to the following places:
Wygiełzów, Lesser Poland Voivodeship (south Poland)
Wygiełzów, Bełchatów County in Łódź Voivodeship (central Poland)
Wygiełzów, Zduńska Wola County in Łódź Voivodeship (central Poland)
Wygiełzów, Świętokrzyskie Voivodeship (south-central Poland)
Wygiełzów, Silesian Voivodeship (south Poland)